Jaanam is a 1993 Indian Hindi-language film directed by debutante Vikram Bhatt. It stars Rahul Roy and Pooja Bhatt. It has a critically and publicly acclaimed soundtrack by Anu Malik. This movie was a remake of cult classic Bobby (1973 film) by showman Raj Kapoor.

Plot summary
Paradise Builders is owned by Dhanraj, who lives a very wealthy lifestyle with his wife, Radha; son, Rajan; and daughter, Anjali. His aim is to take possession of the nearby village, which is now occupied by fishermen, headed by Shankar Rao, who lives there with his wife and two sons, Amar and Arun. Dhanraj's attempts to take possession prove to be in vain. Then the inevitable happens when Amar and Anjali meet and fall in love with each other, much to the chagrin of both Shankar and Dhanraj. While Shankar wants Amar to continue to follow his profession, Dhanraj wants Anjali to wed U.S.-based Shekhar Gupta, the son of the owner of Gupta Investments. Push leads to shove, and Dhanraj asks Rajan to set fire to the village. As a result, Rajan and Arun get killed. A grief-stricken Dhanraj swears on his son's ashes that he will avenge this death by killing Amar - at any and all costs. Watch what impact this has on the Rao family, as well as on Amar and Anjali.

Cast
 Rahul Roy... Amar S. Rao
 Pooja Bhatt... Anjali bhatt
 Paresh Rawal... Shankar Rao
 Ashutosh Gowariker... Arun S. Rao
 Sulabha Arya... Kamla
 Avtar Gill... Police Inspector
 Vikram Gokhale... Dhanraj 
Pavan Malhotra... Rajan
 Reema Lagoo... Shankar's wife
 Nandita Thakur... Radha
 Satyajit Jha.....  Kadam
 Anant Jog...

Soundtrack

The Songs of the movie were composed by Anu Malik. The album was very popular upon release with songs  "Teri Chahat Ke Siwa", "Mere Dil Ka Pata", "Mari Gayi" and "Dil Jigar Jaan Accha Hai" being hits. Soundtrack provided by T-Series.

References

External links

1992 films
1990s Hindi-language films
1990s romantic musical films
1992 romantic drama films
Films directed by Vikram Bhatt
Films scored by Anu Malik
Indian romantic musical films
Indian romantic drama films